Lieutenant General Sir Thomas Herbert John Chapman Goodwin  (24 May 1871 – 29 September 1960), known as Sir John Goodwin, was a British soldier and medical practitioner, who served as the Governor of Queensland from 1927 to 1932.

Early life and military career
Goodwin was born on 24 May 1871 in Kandy, Ceylon (now Sri Lanka) to a British Army surgeon father and an Australian mother. He was educated in England at Newton College, Devon, and undertook medical training at St Mary's Hospital, London where he graduated with a Membership of the Royal College of Surgeons and Royal College of Physicians in 1891.

Commissioned a lieutenant in the British Army Medical Department, Goodwin was stationed in India where he saw active service on the North-West Frontier from 1897 to 1898 and was awarded to the Distinguished Service Order.

Governor of Queensland
Goodwin served as Governor of Queensland from 13 July 1927 to 7 April 1932.

Wilson was a freemason. During his term as governor, he was also Grand Master of the Grand Lodge of Queensland.

References

1871 births
1960 deaths
Companions of the Distinguished Service Order
Foreign recipients of the Distinguished Service Medal (United States)
Governors of Queensland
Knights Commander of the Order of St Michael and St George
Knights Commander of the Order of the Bath
People from Kandy
Recipients of the Croix de guerre (Belgium)
Royal Army Medical Corps officers
British Army lieutenant generals
Sri Lankan people of British descent
Recipients of the Distinguished Service Medal (US Army)